Vice Admiral Sir George Montague Francis Vallings KCB (31 May 1932 – 25 December 2007) was a Royal Navy officer who became Flag Officer, Scotland and Northern Ireland.

Naval career
Educated at Belhaven Hill School in Dunbar and the Royal Naval College, Dartmouth, Vallings joined the Royal Navy as a midshipman in 1950 and took part in the Korean War. He also saw action in the Suez Crisis in 1956. He was then given command of the destroyer Defender in 1967 and became executive officer of the destroyer Bristol in 1970. He was made naval attaché at the British High Commission in Canberra in 1975, commanding officer of HMS Apollo as well as captain of the 2nd Frigate Squadron in 1977 and Director of Naval Operations and Trade under the Naval Staff at the Ministry of Defence from March 1978 to May 1980. He went on to be Commodore Clyde in 1980 and then Flag Officer Gibraltar in 1982. He was appointed Flag Officer, Scotland and Northern Ireland in 1985 before retiring in 1987.

In retirement he became Secretary of the Chartered Institute of Management Accountants.

Family
In 1964 he married Tessa Julia Cousins; they had three sons.

References

1932 births
2007 deaths
People educated at Belhaven Hill School
Graduates of Britannia Royal Naval College
Royal Navy vice admirals
Knights Commander of the Order of the Bath
Royal Navy personnel of the Korean War
British military personnel of the Suez Crisis